Brookula argentina is a species of sea snail, a marine gastropod mollusk, unassigned in the superfamily Seguenzioidea.

Description
The height of the shell attains 1.2 mm.

Distribution
This marine species occurs off South Georgia and Antarctica

References

External links
 To Encyclopedia of Life
 To World Register of Marine Species

argentina
Gastropods described in 2006